Westminster District was a federal electoral district in British Columbia, Canada, that was represented in the House of Commons of Canada from 1917 to 1921.

This riding was created in 1914 and was used only in the federal election of 1917.  It was partly created out of the New Westminster and partly from the Yale—Cariboo electoral district.  It was renamed "Fraser Valley" in 1919-1966.

Members of Parliament

Election results

See also 

 List of Canadian federal electoral districts
 Past Canadian electoral districts

External links 

Library of Parliament. Westminster District - Riding history

Former federal electoral districts of British Columbia